The Curious Room is a book collecting various plays and scripts by English writer Angela Carter. Its full title is The Curious Room: Plays, Film Scripts and an Opera.

The book contains her original screenplays for the films The Company of Wolves and The Magic Toyshop, both of which were based on her own original stories. It also contains a draft of a libretto for an opera based on Orlando: A Biography by Virginia Woolf, and five radio plays: "Vampirella", which she then reworked as "The Lady of the House of Love" in The Bloody Chamber collection, "The Company of Wolves", "Puss in Boots" (both reworkings of Charles Perrault's fairy tales) and two "artificial biographies", one of Victorian painter, Richard Dadd, who murdered his father, and the other about Edwardian novelist, Ronald Firbank. The collection also includes the unproduced screenplays Gun for the Devil (based upon an earlier short work of hers, collected in American Ghosts and Old World Wonders) and  The Christchurch Murders (based on the Parker–Hulme murder case which also influenced the 1994 Peter Jackson film Heavenly Creatures), as well a stage adaptation of Frank Wedekind's Lulu plays.  Carter's television work also included a controversial documentary entitled The Holy Family Album, which is not published here.

Edited and with production notes provided by Mark Bell, with an introduction by Susannah Clapp, the book was published by Chatto and Windus in 1996, four years after Angela Carter's death.

References 
Charlotte Crofts (1996), Review of Angela Carter (1996), The Curious Room: Collected Dramatic Works, London: Chatto and Windus in Times Literary Supplement, 8 November, p. 34.
Charlotte Crofts (2003) Anagrams of Desire: Angela Carter's Writings for Radio, Film and Television (London: Chatto & Windus).

Books by Angela Carter
Dramatic works by Angela Carter
Books published posthumously
Chatto & Windus books
1996 books